The discography of Black Francis, an American rock musician, includes 15 studio albums, four live albums, five compilation albums, one EP, one soundtrack album, and 15 singles.

This list includes material recorded as Black Francis or Frank Black, but does not include material performed with Pixies or Grand Duchy.

Albums

Studio albums

Live albums

Compilation albums

Soundtrack albums

Extended plays

Singles

Other appearances

Guest appearances

See also
Pixies discography
Grand Duchy

Notes and references 

Rock music discographies
Discographies of American artists
Discography